Alfred Badel (born 19 October 1943) is a Swiss racewalker. He competed in the men's 50 kilometres walk at the 1972 Summer Olympics.

References

1943 births
Living people
Athletes (track and field) at the 1972 Summer Olympics
Swiss male racewalkers
Olympic athletes of Switzerland
Place of birth missing (living people)